La Lettre B is a Belgian news magazine founded in 2010.

History 
Created by Filippo Giuffrida Répaci and a group of Brussels journalists, the monthly magazine La Lettre B is published since 15 January 2010 by ESL Academy.

In the journal's first issue, its editor-in-chief, Lorenzo Scattini, explained the choice of La Lettre B as a title with the following statement: B comme Bruxelles, B comme Business, B comme Bourse, B comme Banques... Economie – Finances – Transactions financières – Régulation. Retrouvez chaque mois dans "La lettre B" l’essentiel de l’actualité économique et financière décryptée.

The idea behind the magazine is to highlight what is new in the Brussels EU bubble seen by independent journalists with a business approach.

After a few years of irregular publications, in 2015, La Lettre B – New Edition was revived due to the efforts of Filippo Giuffrida Répaci, who became its director.
Since the beginning, La Lettre B has published articles in English and French addressed at the European business community.

Notes and references

External links
la Lettre B Website  

2010 establishments in Belgium
News magazines published in Belgium
Monthly magazines published in Belgium
French-language magazines
Magazines established in 2010
Magazines published in Brussels
Irregularly published magazines
English-language magazines